Raas is an Indonesian island located to the east of the larger island of Madura, East Java. The island acts as the administrative capital of the Raas district, which includes several surrounding islands. The Raas cat, an endemic domestic cat breed of Indonesia, is believed to be originated from the island.

References

Citations

External links 
 Map of Raas Island

Islands of East Java
Populated places in Indonesia